Bethel Beach Natural Area Preserve is a  Natural Area Preserve located in Mathews County, Virginia, near the Chesapeake Bay. It contains beach, low dune, and salt marsh habitats, and provides a haven for rare marsh and colonial nesting birds, The preserve also protects habitat for two globally rare species, the northeastern beach tiger beetle and sea-beach knotweed.

The preserve is owned and maintained by the Virginia Department of Conservation and Recreation, and is open to the public; however the preserve is largely undeveloped with the exception of a gravel parking area for visitors.

See also
 List of Virginia Natural Area Preserves
 List of Virginia state forests
 List of Virginia state parks

References

External links
Virginia Department of Conservation and Recreation: Bethel Beach Natural Area Preserve

Virginia Natural Area Preserves
Protected areas of Mathews County, Virginia
Landforms of Mathews County, Virginia
Beaches of Virginia